Chalandri (Ancient Greek: Φλύα, Phlya) is a suburb in the northern part of the Athens agglomeration, Greece. It is a municipality of the Attica region.

Geography

The municipality has an area of 10.805 km2. Chalandri was a small village until the rapid expansion of Athens during the 1960s and 1970s. Its built-up area is now continuous with those of the neighbouring suburbs Filothei, Marousi, Vrilissia, Agia Paraskevi, Cholargos, Neo Psychiko and Psychiko. Nevertheless, it has still a high ratio of open green areas per citizen in the Athens agglomeration. Several embassies are based in Chalandri. It is one of the largest suburbs in terms of population, with more than 70,000 residents. It holds an independent municipality status since 1944. Chalandri is served by the Chalandri, Agia Paraskevi, Doukissis Plakentias as well as Nomismatokopio and Cholargos metro station (the latter two being shared with Papagou-Cholargos).

According to the Köppen Climate Classification system, Chalandri has a warm-summer Mediterranean climate, abbreviated "Csa" on climate maps.

Neighborhoods
Agia Varvara
Ano Chalandri
Doukissis Plakentias (Neo Chalandri)
Kato Chalandri
Patima
Metamorfosi
Polydroso
Rizarios
Toufa (or Fragoklisia)
Sidera
Synoikismos
Center Chalandri

Historical population

The village was historically Arvanitika speaking, with 3,000 Arvanites inhabiting it, however due to its proximity to Athens, it has undergone a language shift. After the 1922 Asia Minor Catastrophe and the 1923 Greco-Turkish population exchange, some Greek refugees settled in the town.

Culture

Education
American Community Schools is located in Chalandri.

Health care

Municipal Infirmary of Chalandri

Sports
Sport clubs of Chalandri with presence in Greek national divisions are AE Chalandriou (Athlitiki Enosi Chalandriou), GS Chalandriou (Gymnastikos Syllogos Chalandriou) and Nireas Chalandriou. The municipality of Chalandri has also created an extensive channel of sports installations such as tennis courts, football pitches, volleyball and basketball indoor and outdoor courts and also an indoor and outdoor olympic-size swimming pool in order to enhance the athletic spirit of the inhabitants.

Also, due to the geographical convenience of the area of Chalandri there is an extensive bike route, covering the neighbourhoods from Doukissis Plakentias metro station, to Vrilissia and Gearakas area, reaching until Chalandri downtown city centre, providing safe transportations for families and individuals improving the life level of the area.

See also
List of municipalities of Attica

References

External links

Official website 

 
Municipalities of Attica
Populated places in North Athens (regional unit)
Arvanite settlements